The Universidad de Medellín (UdeMedellín or UdeM) is a Colombian private university located in Medellín offering 27 undergraduate programs, 36 specializations, 21 masters, and six doctoral programs. It was founded on February 1, 1950, by a group of prominent professors and intellectuals in response to the intolerance and political persecution that existed in the country, with the goal of creating a secular and welcoming institution apart from the political ideologies of the time.

It has seven academic faculties such as Law, economic and administrative sciences, engineering, communication, design, basic sciences and social and human sciences.

In 2021, the National Ministry of Education renewed the university's Institutional Accreditation of High Quality until 2027.

History

1960-1990 
In 1961, the Institution was moved to the University Citadel of Belén los Alpes.

In 1965, the first soccer field was inaugurated.

1990-2000 
In the 1990s, Néstor Hincapié Vargas, an indigenous politician from Peñol, was chosen as rector. He had previously served as governor of Antioquia in 1999, the secretary of Government and Citizen Support, of Education and Administrative Services of the department of Antioquia and manager of the Charity of Antioquia. He administered the university during 20 years alongside Aura Marleny Arcila, who during this period acted as the president of the university and the chancellor of Medellín during four periods.

During this time, the rector acquired more than 23 properties around the country and outsourced the surveillance and cleaning of the institution to the firms Serconal and Seiso, both controlled by the university and which also contracted hospital and surveillance services with the state.

2000-Present 
In 2015, the university was involved in a scandal for the election of comptroller general of Antioquia in which Julián Bedoya, then the representative of the Chamber and ex-president of the Assembly of Antioquia, and Orfa Nelly Henao, president of the Assembly, had adjusted the convocation to choose the departamental comptroller so that the post would be given to professor Carlos Molina, given that the requirements were written with the help of said professor and included various requirements that only favored himself, such as holding a doctorate from a university abroad. This was demonstrated through the leaking of various e-mails that culminated in the non-election of the candidate.

In 2019, Aura Marleny Arcila was re-elected for the fifth time as the chancellor of Medellín, during which time she held the dual position of being president of the council of the university and president of the council of Medellín.

In 2019, both the rector Néstor Hincapié and councilwoman Aura Marleny supported the candidate of David Ospina to occupy the post of comptroller of Antioquia, but his election was rejected by the city councils for fear that he had used his privilege to obtain election to this office. The rectorship of Néstor Hincapié ended in 2020 in a political scandal when the district attorney pressed criminal charges against the then-rector and various professors for having apparently given Julian Bedoya, who had not fulfilled the lawful requirements, a law degree in exchange for votes in favor of the university's political group. Aura Marleny also resigned from her position inside the council. Both continue being part of the group of 100.

In 2020, the Council elected Federico Restrepo Posada as the rector of the university.

Rectors 

 Libardo López Restrepo
 Germán Medina Angulo
 Eduardo Fernández Botero
 Bernardo Trujillo Calle (1962-1964)
 Juan Peláez Sierra (1964)
 Germán Vélez Gutiérrez
 Gustavo Rendón Gaviria
 Luis Carlos Calle Calle
 Orión Álvarez Atehortúa
 Eduardo Franco Posada
 Pedro Pablo Cardona Galeano
 Ignacio Cadavid Gómez
 Iván Gómez Osorio
 Jaime Tobón Villegas
 Enrique Olano Asuad
 Fernando Jaramillo Jaramillo
 Jorge Mario Ortiz Abad
 César Augusto Fernández Posada
 Néstor Hincapié Vargas (2000-2020)
 César Guerra Arroyave (2020)
 Federico Restrepo Posada (2020-Actual)

References

External links

 Official site 
 English side: http://www.udem.edu.co/index.php

Private universities and colleges in Colombia
Universities and colleges in Medellín
Educational institutions established in 1950
1950 establishments in Colombia